Harlem Township is one of the eighteen townships of Delaware County, Ohio, United States. The 2010 census reported a population of 3,953 in the township.

Geography
Located in the southeastern corner of the county, it borders the following townships:
Trenton Township - north
Hartford Township, Licking County - northeast corner
Monroe Township, Licking County - east
Jersey Township, Licking County - southeast corner
Plain Township, Franklin County - south
Blendon Township, Franklin County - southwest corner
Genoa Township - west
Berkshire Township - northwest corner

No municipalities are located in Harlem Township.

Name and history
Harlem Township was organized in 1810.

It is the only Harlem Township statewide.

Government
The township is governed by a three-member board of trustees, who are elected in November of odd-numbered years to a four-year term beginning on the following January 1. Two are elected in the year after the presidential election and one is elected in the year before it. There is also an elected township fiscal officer, who serves a four-year term beginning on April 1 of the year after the election, which is held in November of the year before the presidential election. Vacancies in the fiscal officership or on the board of trustees are filled by the remaining trustees.

Public services
Emergency services in Harlem Township are provided by the Harlem Township Division of Fire. The department is staffed 24/7 with the capability to provide fire/rescue and ALS medical services.

Gallery

References

External links
Township website 
County website

Townships in Delaware County, Ohio
Townships in Ohio